Balabhumi (Malayalam: ബാലഭൂമി) is a Malayalam comic magazine published by Mathrubhumi Publications. It was launched in April, 1996 by the Calicut-based Malayalam newspaper Mathrubhumi. The magazine became a weekly in May 1996.

Along with the comics (in-house and syndicated), the content includes fables and fairy tales, rhymes, (translated) literary classics, and various puzzles. It is the first Malayalam comic magazine to syndicate Disney Comics.

Stories and articles 
 Magic Malu (artist: M. Mohandas) story of a magician rabbit who helps everybody from any problem.
 E-Man (Unnikrishnan kidangoor, Jingle bell creations) : The only Action Hero of Balabhumi.
 Meeshamarjaran (Vallicode santhosh, Devaprakash) : Story of two best friends but will fall in a trap in the end.
 Kunchoos :(Unnikrishnan kidangoor, Jingle bell creations)  One of the naughtiest boy in Balabhumi.
 Mallanunniyum Villanunniyum:(Unnikrishnan kidangoor, Jingle bell creations) Story of two brothers one (Villanunni) is intelligent but not strong another (Mallanunni) is strong but not intelligent.
 Master Tintu: Story of a naughty boy who says super jokes.
 Boli : Story of a girl who is naughty.
 Vikru & Durbalan:(Unnikrishnan Kidangoor, Jingle bell creations ) Story of a little bear got friendly with a lion named Durbalan.
 Gira

References

Comics publications
Malayalam comics
Magazines published in India
Weekly newspapers